Beiser is a surname. Notable people with the surname include:

Arthur Beiser, an American physicist
Brendan Beiser (born 1970), Canadian actor
Daniel V. Beiser, Democratic member of the Illinois House of Representatives
Edward Beiser (1942–2009), Dean at Brown University, political scientist and a constitutional scholar.
Frederick C. Beiser (born 1949), one of the leading scholars of German Idealism 
Maya Beiser (born 1963), American cellist
Morton Beiser (born 1936), Canadian professor, psychiatrist, and epidemiologist
Tim Beiser (born 1959), literary pseudonym of American-Canadian author and journalist J. Timothy Hunt
Trude Beiser (born 1927), Austrian former alpine skier
Vince Beiser (born 1965), American-Canadian journalist

See also
Ed Beisser (1919–2000), American basketball player